Mahowald is a surname and may refer to:

Mark Mahowald (1931–2013), American mathematician
Meghan Elisse Mahowald (born February 7, 1991), better known by her stage name MEGG, American singer, songwriter, and musician
Misha Mahowald (1963–1996), American computational neuroscientist 
Natalie Mahowald (born 1963), American Earth scientist